"Brennisteinn" (Icelandic for "Brimstone", pronounced /ˈprɛnːɪˌsteitn/) is a song written and recorded by Icelandic post-rock band Sigur Rós for their seventh studio album Kveikur. It appears as the opening track on the album. "Brennisteinn" was released as the lead single from the album on March 25, 2013, after the album's official unveiling three days earlier.

Reception

"Brennisteinn" was released to overwhelmingly positive reception. "Brennisteinn", then, is a big payoff in that regard." He further calls the track a "heaven/hell juxtaposition" that "feels like the most logical step imaginable for Sigur Rós in light of last year's Valtari, a Calgon bath of a record that suggested that the band had run out of ideas." Grayson Hale of Sputnikmusic stated "As just a small taste of what's to come, "Brennisteinn" certainly achieves its goal of whetting the appetite." While Hale also makes a comparison to 2002's, he writes "Although no two albums of theirs sound exactly alike, this is the first time we are really hearing something of a reinvention from the group."

Jake Jenkins of the Sanctuary Review noted of the band's approach of a more "aggressive" sound, but in allusion to this he wrote that "aggressive is an understatement." He describes the track as "a menacing, lurching beast of a song that will rattle you to your core." He criticizes Jonsi's vocal performance by stating that "Jonsi's vocals typically stay in his lower register but they still sit high above the rest of the music throughout the track, though their atmospheric texture lends itself perfectly to the song, and when he does get into that upper register they don't sound out of place in the least bit." However, he goes on to give the overall song a positive review by writing "Over the course of the 7 minutes, Sigur Rós prove that they have not only stayed true to their word of exploring a more aggressive sound but proved that they could pull it off in ways that exceed all expectations. Considering they were recently reduced to a trio, the fact that they sound this huge is impressive. If the rest of Kveikur is along the same lines as "Brennisteinn", we may be getting the best Sigur Rós album since.

Joe Stadele of The Way That He Sings called the song "a mammoth". He described the track as "brutal, dark, and unsettling." He writes "Like an approaching torrential storm, the song reveals itself in waves. First the pitter-patter of rain, then a thunderous buzz saw drone followed by marching stomp percussion. Yet somewhere in the darkness, Sigur Rós sprinkle rays of light amongst the orchestral storm and the song is propelled to all new heights through the falsetto vocals of Jónsi Birgisson and accompanying strings. He further complimented the band by saying "If this is any indication of the newly downsized three-piece’s new direction, Sigur Rós fans are in for a treat and true return to form."

Live performances
"Brennisteinn" was first performed live in November 2012, during the Iceland Airwaves 2012 music festival, where they were the headlining act. It has also been an integral part of the band's Sigur Rós World Tour since the performance, usually appearing as the final song on the main set, before the encore performance.

Usage in media
"Brennisteinn" was first used in commercial media in the E3 trailer for Ubisoft Montreal's critically acclaimed 2013 video game, Assassin's Creed IV: Black Flag.

On September 1, 2013, the track "Brennisteinn" was incorporated into the BBC's Original British Drama: 2013 special multi-series preview.  The video, which aired on YouTube, included teasers from Sherlock, Ripper Street, The Escape Artist, and others.

The track was used in a commercial for Alien fragrance by French fashion brand Thierry Mugler which portrayed the awakening of Sun Goddess. The video starring Moldavian model Alexandra Tzurkan was released online internationally on 25 February 2014.

On July 25, 2014 the track was used for the Walking Dead season 5 comic-con trailer which debuted on October 12, 2014.

Music video
The music video for "Brennisteinn" was released on March 22, 2013 to coincide with the official unveiling of Kveikur. Directed by Andrew Huang, who has also worked with Björk, the video lasts over eight minutes and features the band playing on an open stage, cutting back and forth between shots of the band and a narrative sequence which depicts the capture of a prisoner, his escape and chase. The entire music video is contrastless in Black-and-white photography, with a color splash effect that brings color only to patches of the video that are colored in shades of yellow and contrasting colors of yellow and green.

Track listing

Personnel
Adapted from Kveikur liner notes.

Sigur Rós
Jón Þór Birgisson – vocals, guitar
Georg Hólm – bass
Orri Páll Dýrason – drums

Additional musicians
Eiríkur Orri Ólafsson - brass arrangement
Daníel Bjarnason - string arrangement
Sigrún Jónsdóttir - brass
Eiríkur Orri Ólafsson - brass
Bergrún Snæbjörnsdóttir - brass
Borgar Magnason - strings
Margrét Árnadóttir - strings
Pálína Árnadóttir - strings
Una Sveinbjarnardóttir - strings
Þórunn Ósk Marinósdóttir - strings
Menelik Eu'el Solomon  - sonics

Additional personnel
Ted Jensen - mastering
Rich Costey - mixing
Alex Somers - mixing, recording
Elisabeth Carlsson - assistant mixing
Eric Isip - assistant mixing
Chris Kasych - assistant mixing 
Laura Sisk - assistant mixing
Birgir Jón Birgisson - recording
Valgeir Sigurdsson - recording (strings)

Charts

Release history

References

Sigur Rós songs
2013 singles
2013 songs
XL Recordings singles
Songs written by Jónsi
Songs written by Orri Páll Dýrason
Songs written by Georg Hólm
Icelandic-language songs